Haji Azimulhaq Pahalwan ( 25 Apr 1962 – May 2020) was an Indian politician and a member of the Sixteenth Legislative Assembly of Uttar Pradesh of India. He represented the Tanda constituency in Ambedkar Nagar from  Samajwadi Party during 2012 to Mar 2017 when Akhilesh Yadav was elected as first time Chief Minister of Uttar Pradesh.

Early life and education

Pahalwan was born in Bhulepur, near Hanswar, Uttar Pradesh. He attended the S.Y.N.H.S. School Baskhari and attained degrees.
He died on 5 May 2020.

Political career
Pahalwan was a member of the  Sixteenth Legislative Assembly of Uttar Pradesh since 2012. He represented the Tanda, Ambedkar Nagar constituency and was a member of the Samajwadi Party. In 2017 general election of Uttar Pradesh Legislative Assembly, he was defeated by  Bharatiya Janata Party candidate Sanju Devi with an acute margin of 1723 votes.

Posts held

See also
Uttar Pradesh Legislative Assembly

References

1964 births
2020 deaths
Uttar Pradesh politicians
Samajwadi Party politicians
Indian Muslims
People from Ambedkar Nagar district